
Gmina Żarów is an urban-rural gmina (administrative district) in Świdnica County, Lower Silesian Voivodeship, in south-western Poland.

Neighbouring gminas
Gmina Żarów is bordered by the gminas of Jaworzyna Śląska, Kostomłoty, Marcinowice, Mietków, Strzegom, Świdnica and Udanin.

Villages
Apart from the town of Żarów, the gmina contains the villages of Bożanów, Buków, Gołaszyce, Imbramowice, Kalno, Kruków, Łażany, Marcinowiczki, Mielęcin, Mikoszowa, Mrowiny, Pożarzysko, Przyłęgów, Pyszczyn, Siedlimowice, Wierzbna and Zastruże.

Notable people 
 Wilhelm Wolff (1809-1864), born in Tarnawa, German politician

Twin towns – sister cities

Gmina Żarów is twinned with:
 Lohmar, Germany
 Nymburk, Czech Republic
 Újfehértó, Hungary

References

Zarow
Świdnica County